Quinnipiac Baseball Field is a baseball venue in Hamden, Connecticut, United States.  It is home to the Quinnipiac Bobcats baseball team of the NCAA Division I Metro Atlantic Athletic Conference.  The venue features portable bleacher seating and a press booth.  It also has an embankment in right center field that lies in play.

A group of students, including future head coach Dan Gooley, built the park in the summer of 1966. Previously, the program played at Hamden's Legion Field.

The mountains that make up Sleeping Giant State Park are visible beyond the outfield fence.

See also 
 List of NCAA Division I baseball venues

References 

College baseball venues in the United States
Baseball venues in Connecticut
Quinnipiac Bobcats baseball